The Anderlecht vs Club Brugge derby is a football rivalry between two Belgian First Division A clubs Anderlecht and Club Brugge, the two most successful clubs in Belgium. The rivalry started in the early 1970s as Club Brugge emerged as a major title contender to the dominant Anderlecht. The game is called 'De Klassieker', Dutch for 'the Classic'. 

The rivalry is slightly superseded by the Anderlecht vs Standard Liege rivalry which predates it despite Club Brugge being more successful than Standard in recent years. Flemish speakers tend to see Anderlecht vs. Club Brugge as the main derby while French speakers name Anderlecht vs. Standard Liège as more important.

History
The two first met during the 1921–22 season. They have both been ever-present in the top flight since 1959–60.

All-time results

League

Cup

References

Derby
R.S.C Anderlecht
Football rivalries in Belgium
Sport in Bruges